Péter Farkas (born 11 July 1987) is a Hungarian football player who currently plays for Veresegyház VSK.

References
Player profile at HLSZ 
Péter Farkas at MLSZ

1987 births
Living people
People from Cegléd
Hungarian footballers
Association football midfielders
Vác FC players
Kaposvári Rákóczi FC players
Dunaharaszti MTK players
Nemzeti Bajnokság I players
Nemzeti Bajnokság II players
Sportspeople from Pest County